Jay Creek is in the MacDonnell Ranges  west of Alice Springs in the Northern Territory in Australia. It was a government reserve for Aboriginal Australians which for a time in the late 1920s and early 1930s included 45 children from a home named "The Bungalow"(37 of whom were under the age of 12) temporarily housed in a corrugated iron shed with a superintendent and matron housed separately in two tents.

Jay Creek was home to the Western Arrernte people.  In 1937 Jay Creek was declared as one of three permanent camps or reserves for the Alice Springs Aboriginal population.  It was intended  a buffer between the semi-nomadic people living in far western regions and the more sophisticated inhabitants of Alice Springs and environs, in particular for the non-working, aged and infirm around Alice.

References 

Ghost towns in the Northern Territory
Aboriginal communities in the Northern Territory
Indigenous Australian reserves